Bečevica is a village situated in Knić municipality Šumadija District in Serbia.

References

Populated places in Šumadija District